Helcogramma ascensionis, the Ascension triplefin, is a species of triplefin blenny in the genus Helcogramma. it was described by Roger Lubbock in 1980.

References

ascensionis
Taxa named by Roger Lubbock
Fish described in 1980